David Forniés Aquilino (born 2 June 1991) is a Spanish professional footballer who plays for CD Atlético Baleares as a left-back.

Club career
A Valencia CF youth graduate, Forniés was born in Elche, Province of Alicante. He made his senior debut with their reserves in 2010, in the Tercera División. In 2011 he moved to another reserve team, Deportivo Aragón of Segunda División B.

In summer 2013, after suffering relegation to the fourth division, Forniés joined Getafe CF B one league above. On 10 July 2014 he agreed to a two-year contract with Segunda División club AD Alcorcón, but severed his ties on 20 August.

Forniés returned to the third tier on 22 August 2014, after signing for Lleida Esportiu. He remained in the division the following years, representing CE Sabadell FC, Cultural y Deportiva Leonesa, Real Murcia and FC Cartagena; he achieved promotions with Cultural and Cartagena, in 2017 and 2020 respectively.

Forniés made his professional debut on 13 September 2020 at the age of 29, starting in the 0–0 away draw against Real Oviedo. He scored his first league goal the following 7 March, but in a 2–1 loss at RCD Mallorca.

On 1 August 2021, Forniés returned to Alcorcón on a one-year deal. At its termination, he joined CD Atlético Baleares in the Primera Federación.

Honours
Cultural Leonesa
Segunda División B: 2016–17

References

External links

1991 births
Living people
Spanish footballers
Footballers from Elche
Association football defenders
Segunda División players
Segunda División B players
Tercera División players
Primera Federación players
Valencia CF Mestalla footballers
Real Zaragoza B players
Getafe CF B players
AD Alcorcón footballers
Lleida Esportiu footballers
CE Sabadell FC footballers
Cultural Leonesa footballers
Real Murcia players
FC Cartagena footballers
CD Atlético Baleares footballers